Săucești is a commune in Bacău County, Western Moldavia, Romania. It is composed of five villages: Bogdan Vodă, Săucești, Schineni, Șerbești and Siretu.

References

Communes in Bacău County
Localities in Western Moldavia